Salehabad-e Sofla (also Romanized as Şaleḩābād-e Soflá; also known as Şaleḩābād) is a village in Chahar Gonbad Rural District, in the Central District of Sirjan County, Kerman Province, Iran. At the 2006 census, its population was 18, in 4 families.

References 

Populated places in Sirjan County